Kandep Rural LLG is one of two LLGs of the Kandep District of Enga Province, Papua New Guinea. It is located in southern Wabag, the capital town of Enga Province. Kandep shares land borders with Laiagam - Porgera, Wabag, and Wapenimanda District, along with additional land borders between the Southern Highlands, the Western Highlands provinces, and the newly Provinces.

Wabag is accessible via a three-hour road trip along the Kandep - Laiagam Road. Access via Kandep - Mendi Road is currently unavailable due to construction efforts; however, the Kandep - Magarima Road remains connected.

Kandep LLG comprises council wards from Lai and Mariant. The Lai River which flows from north to south divides the District into two LLGs.

Wards
01. Weri
02. Mumund
03. Iuripaka
04. Supi
05. Aluwaip
06. Gini
07. Komborosa
08. Imali (Pindata)
09. Pindaka
10. Pura
11. Kambia
12. Koropa
13. Lagalap No.1
14. Lakalap No.2
15. Winjap No.1
16. Winjap No.2
17. Lawe
18. Muyen
19. Warabim No.1
20. Warabim No.2
21. Teteres
22. Yapum
23. Murip
24. Lakis
25. Lyumbi Island
26. Porgeramanda
27. Kokas
28. Rugutengesa
29. Kandep Stn
30. Sawi
31. Werit 2
32. Ipul
33. Komatin (Megere)
34. Tinjipak (Supi No.2)
35. Wambokon (Gini No.2)
36. Kondo (Kombolos No.2)
37. Kamale (Imali 2)
38. Kalimang (Pindak 2)
39. Mamamdai Pura 2
40. Kambia 2
41. Lauk Kolopa 2
42. Tarapis
43. Kiap Akulia
44. Lawe 2
45. Kemau Tesres
46. Kiakau Murip 2
47. Keso
48. Wapis Kokas 2
49. Nangulam Lungutenges 2
50. Sawi No.2
51. Kola
52. Kolopen

References

External links 
 

Local-level governments of Enga Province